Shetou Township is a rural township in Changhua County, Taiwan.

Geography
Shetou has a population of 41,613 (January 2023) 

Administrative divisions
The township comprises 24 villages: Beidou, Guangfu, Guangxing, Jiushe, Liren, Longjing, Lunya, Meiya, Nande, Nanya, Pinghe, Qiaotou, Qingshui, Renhe, Renya, Shanhu, Shetou, Songzhu, Taian, Tungxing, Xiehe, Xincuo, Zhangcuo and Zhaoxing.

Tourist attractions
 Fangqiaotou Tianmen Temple
 Houtanjing Sky Bridge
 Shetou Doushan Temple

Transportation

 TRA Shetou Station

Notable natives
 Fang Wen-lin, singer and actress

References

External links

 Shetou Township Office Information Network, Changhua County 

Townships in Changhua County